Senate elections were held in South Vietnam on 26 August 1973. The election was contested by a total of four lists, of which two would be elected and receive 15 seats each. Each voter had two votes. Voter turnout was reported to be 92.7%.

Results

References

South Vietnam
Elections in South Vietnam
Senate election
Election and referendum articles with incomplete results